Trump v. Hawaii, No. 17-965, 585 U.S. ___ (2018), was a landmark United States Supreme Court case involving Presidential Proclamation 9645 signed by President Donald Trump, which restricted travel into the United States by people from several nations, or by refugees without valid travel documents. Hawaii and several other states and groups challenged the Proclamation and two predecessor executive orders also issued by Trump on statutory and constitutional grounds. Citing a variety of statements by Trump and administration officials, they argued that the proclamation and its predecessor orders were motivated by anti-Muslim animus.

A U.S. district court issued a preliminary injunction preventing the ban from coming into effect, finding that plaintiffs were likely to succeed on their argument that the proclamation violated the Establishment Clause of the First Amendment to the United States Constitution and exceeded the president's powers under the Immigration and Nationality Act (INA). This injunction was affirmed by the U.S. Court of Appeals for the Ninth Circuit, which ruled that the proclamation was likely a violation of INA; the court of appeals did not reach the constitutional issue.  

On June 26, 2018, the Supreme Court reversed the Court of Appeals in a 5–4 decision, ruling that plaintiffs did not have  "likelihood of success on the merits" on either their INA or their Establishment Clause claims. The court vacated the injunction and remanded the case to lower courts for further proceedings. The decision of the Court, written by Chief Justice John Roberts, applied rational basis review and emphasized deference to the executive branch. In addressing the travel ban, the Court also repudiated the infamous decision of Korematsu v. United States, which had justified the President's powers to establish internment camps for Japanese Americans during World War II.  

In dissent, Justice Sotomayor wrote that the majority's decision "redeploys the same dangerous logic underlying Korematsu and merely replaces one gravely wrong decision with another." Responding to this dissent, Roberts wrote for the majority that "Korematsu has nothing to do with this case. The forcible relocation of U.S. citizens to concentration camps, solely and explicitly on the basis of race, is objectively unlawful and outside the scope of Presidential authority." It is not agreed upon among legal scholars as to whether this statement actually overturned Korematsu or was merely a "disapproving dictum" of it.

Background

Executive Orders 13769 and 13780 
As part of his immigration policy, United States President Donald Trump had sought to limit foreigners from certain countries from traveling into the United States. Initially he signed Executive Order 13769 (EO 13769) on January 27, 2017, which among its provisions banned entry to citizens of Iran, Iraq, Libya, Somalia, Sudan, Syria, and Yemen for a 90-day period regardless of their visa status, and suspended the United States Refugee Admissions Program (USRAP) for 120 days. Because the countries affected have large Muslim populations and Trump repeatedly called for banning Muslim immigration during his Presidential campaign, EO 13769 was commonly referred to as the "Muslim ban", and was heavily criticized by many state legislatures and federal lawmakers. Several lawsuits were filed to challenge the order, and in Washington v. Trump, heard in the United States Court of Appeals for the Ninth Circuit, a restraining order was placed on enforcement of EO 13769 on February 3, 2017.

President Trump then signed Executive Order 13780 (EO 13780) on March 6, 2017, replacing EO 13769 to acknowledge the findings from the Ninth Circuit. It did not outright ban travel from citizens of Iran, Libya, Somalia, Sudan, Syria, and Yemen, but required significant additional scrutiny before they would be able to enter the United States and banned new visas for these countries for 90 days. It also continued to suspend USRAP for 120 days.

Hawaii's challenge to EO 13780 
As with EO 13769, EO 13780 was immediately criticized and was legally challenged in several cases. Of note was a challenge from the State of Hawaii, which formed the basis of the Supreme Court case. Hawaii brought a civil action challenging the executive order on March 7, asking for declaratory judgment and an injunction halting the order. The State of Hawaii moved for leave to file an Amended Complaint pertaining to Executive Order 13780. Doug Chin, Hawaii's Attorney General, publicly stated, "This new executive order is nothing more than Muslim Ban 2.0. Under the pretense of national security, it still targets immigrants and refugees. It leaves the door open for even further restrictions." Hawaii's legal challenge to the revised ban cites top White House advisor Stephen Miller as saying the revised travel ban is meant to achieve the same basic policy outcome as the original.

The Amended Complaint lists eight specific causes of action pertaining to Executive Order 13780:
 Violation of the First Amendment's Establishment Clause claiming the travel ban targets Muslims
 Violation of the Fifth Amendment's Equal Protection clause
 Violation of the Fifth Amendment's Due Process Clause (substantive due process)
 Violation of the Fifth Amendment's Due Process Clause (procedural due process)
 Violation of the Immigration and Nationality Act of 1952 (a)(1)(A) and (f) and (a)
 Violations of the Religious Freedom Restoration Act -1(a)
 Substantive violation of the Administrative Procedure Act through violations of the Constitution, Immigration and Nationality Act, and arbitrary and capricious action (2)(A)–(C).
 Procedural violation of the Administrative Procedure Act (2)(D), (1), and 

On March 15, 2017, Judge Derrick Watson of the United States District Court for the District of Hawaii issued a temporary restraining order preventing sections 2 and 6 of executive order 13780 from going into effect. In his order, Judge Watson ruled that the State of Hawaii showed a strong likelihood of success on their Establishment Clause claim in asserting that Executive Order 13780 was in fact a "Muslim ban". Judge Watson stated in his ruling, "When considered alongside the constitutional injuries and harms discussed above, and the questionable evidence supporting the Government's national security motivations, the balance of equities and public interests justify granting the Plaintiffs. Nationwide relief is appropriate in light of the likelihood of success on the Establishment Clause claim." He also stated, concerning the Order's neutrality to religion, that the government's position that Courts may not look behind the exercise of executive discretion and must only review the text of the Order was rejected as being legally incorrect, and that:

In drawing its conclusion, the Court further quoted the Ninth Circuit appeal ruling on the original Executive Order (13769): "It is well established that evidence of purpose beyond the face of the challenged law may be considered in evaluating Establishment and Equal Protection Clause claims", and quoted in support of its findings, previous rulings that "Official action that targets religious conduct for distinctive treatment cannot be shielded by mere compliance with the requirement of facial neutrality" (Church of the Lukumi Babalu Aye v. City of Hialeah); "a facially neutral statute violated the Establishment Clause in light of legislative history demonstrating an intent to apply regulations only to minority religions" (Larson v. Valente); and that "circumstantial evidence of intent, including the historical background of the decision and statements by decisionmakers, may be considered in evaluating whether a governmental action was motivated by a discriminatory purpose" (Village of Arlington Heights v. Metropolitan Housing); ending with a comment that "the Supreme Court has been even more emphatic: courts may not 'turn a blind eye to the context in which [a] policy arose (McCreary County v. ACLU of Kentucky, ruled that a law becomes unconstitutional under the Establishment Clause if its "ostensible or predominant purpose" is to favor or disfavor any religion over any other). The Court also took into account numerous statements by the President and his team prior to and since election, which had directly stated that he sought a legal means to achieve a total ban on Muslims entering the United States, and a "dearth" of substantive evidence in support of the stated security benefits.

After Judge Watson's ruling a Department of Justice spokeswoman said the administration would continue to defend the executive order in the courts. President Trump denounced the ruling as "an unprecedented judicial overreach", and indicated that the decision would be appealed, if necessary to the Supreme Court, stating that, "We're talking about the safety of our nation, the safety and security of our people. This ruling makes us look weak."

There were 5 opinions attached to the order denying en banc. Stephen Reinhardt and Marsha Berzon each wrote concurring opinions, while Alex Kozinski, Carlos Bea, and Jay Bybee each filed a dissenting opinion. Judge Kozinski of the Ninth Circuit Court of Appeals filed a late dissent on March 17, 2017, to the Ninth Circuit's opinion in Washington v. Trump arguing against the State of Washington's Establishment Clause claims on grounds that Trump's speech during the campaign was political speech protected by the First Amendment. Even though the Ninth Circuit had declined to address that issue in reaching its ruling on Washington v. Trump and U.S. courts do not typically rule on issues that are not before them, Kozinski argued it was appropriate for him to address the issue because Judge Watson in Hawaii had cited the Ninth Circuit opinion in reaching its Establishment Clause ruling.

On March 29, 2017, Judge Watson extended his order blocking the ban for a longer duration. The DOJ appealed this ruling. On May 15, a panel of the Ninth Circuit heard arguments on whether to uphold the nationwide injunction. Acting Solicitor General of the United States Jeffrey Wall and Hawaii's attorney, Neal Katyal, appeared before Circuit Judges Ronald M. Gould, Michael Daly Hawkins, and Richard Paez for an hour of oral arguments in Seattle's William Kenzo Nakamura United States Courthouse.

On June 12, 2017, a unanimous panel of the Ninth Circuit partially upheld Judge Watson's injunction. In its anonymous per curiam decision, the court found President Trump's order violated the relevant statute, and so must be enjoined. However, the court found Judge Watson should have avoided the constitutional question, and that he should not have enjoined the purely internal government vetting review.

On June 19, 2017, Judge Watson complied with the decision of the Ninth Circuit and curtailed the injunction such that the injunction would exempt "internal review procedures that do not burden individuals outside of the executive branch of the federal government".

On June 26, 2017, in an unsigned per curiam decision, the United States Supreme Court stayed the lower court injunctions as applied to those who have no "credible claim of a bona fide relationship with a person or entity in the United States". The Court also granted certiorari and set oral arguments for the fall term. The Court did not clarify what constitutes a bona fide relationship. Justice Clarence Thomas, joined by Justices Samuel Alito, and Neil Gorsuch, partially dissented, writing that the lower courts' entire injunctions against the executive order should be stayed.

On June 29, President Trump sent out a diplomatic cable to embassies and consulates seeking to define what qualifies as a "bona fide relationship", excluding connections with refugee resettlement agencies, and clarifying that step-siblings and half-siblings are close family while grandparents and nephews are not.

On July 14 in Honolulu, Judge Watson found that the President's limitations on refugee resettlement agencies and family definitions violated the Supreme Court's order, writing "grandparents are the epitome of close family members". On July 19, the Supreme Court left in place Judge Watson's order on family definitions, but it stayed while on appeal the part of his injunction on refugee resettlement agencies. Justices Thomas, Alito, and Gorsuch said they would have stayed Judge Watson's entire order. The Court also scheduled oral arguments in the case for October 10. After Judge Watson's order allowing refugee resettlements was then affirmed on appeal, the Supreme Court, on September 12, 2017, issued a stay blocking the order indefinitely.

Presidential Proclamation 9645 
On September 24, 2017, Trump signed the new Presidential Proclamation replacing and expanding the March Executive Order. The Supreme Court canceled its hearing, and Solicitor General Noel Francisco then asked the Court to declare the case moot and also vacate the lower courts' judgments. On October 10, 2017, the Supreme Court did so with regard to the Fourth Circuit case. Justice Sonia Sotomayor dissented, saying the Court should not vacate the judgment below but only dismiss their review as improvidently granted. The Court took no action on the Ninth Circuit case, which addressed the President's refugee ban that expired on October 24.

The Supreme Court allowed the travel ban to go into full effect on December 4, pending legal challenges. Seven of the nine justices lifted the injunctions imposed by the lower courts, while two justices wanted the order to be blocked.

On December 22, 2017, a three-judge panel of United States Court of Appeals for the Ninth Circuit, ruled that President Trump's Executive Order "exceeds the scope of his delegated authority", to deem classes of people by their national origin ineligible to enter the country under the Immigration and Nationality Act. In response, the Trump administration petitioned the Supreme Court for writ of certiorari to challenge the Ninth Circuit's findings, which the Court granted on January 22, 2018.

Supreme Court 
The Court heard oral arguments in Trump v. Hawaii (Docket 17-965) for an hour on April 25, 2018, during which Noel Francisco, the Solicitor General of the United States, personally appeared for the federal government and Neal Katyal appeared for the state.<ref   It was the first time that the Supreme Court had a hearing on any version of the travel ban. Observers of the session believed that the five conservative judges sided with the government in enforcing the ban, though the Court as a whole asked whether the ban equated to religious discrimination and whether it were within presidential power to impose such a ban.

Prior to issuing its ruling in Trump v. Hawaii, the Court ruled on Masterpiece Cakeshop v. Colorado Civil Rights Commission (Docket 16-111), a case involving the intersection of anti-discrimination laws and the free exercise of religion. Amongst considerations informing the decision of the Court was a finding that the defendant's ruling was based on statements made by public officials which evinced "clear and impermissible hostility" and were not religiously neutral towards the petitioner; the Court reversed the officials' ruling on this basis. Justice Anthony Kennedy had referenced his majority opinion of Church of the Lukumi Babalu Aye v. City of Hialeah  which similarly dealt with the neutrality of language that legislators used to justify an otherwise neutrally-worded law, which the Court deemed impermissible and therefore declared the law unconstitutional. Some analysts believed that this part of the majority opinion would affect Trump v. Hawaii; analysts noted "clear and impermissible hostility" in language used to support the ban by public officials, including President Trump.

Opinion of the Court
The Court delivered its opinion on June 26, 2018, ruling in a 5–4 decision split along ideological lines that upheld the validity of the travel ban as within the President's powers. Justices Breyer and Sotomayor both read aloud versions of their dissents from the bench. The decision lifted the current injunction against the travel ban's enforcement and remanded the case to lower courts for review of other arguments raised by the plaintiffs.

Delivering the majority opinion, Chief Justice John Roberts concluded that the language of 8 U. S. C. §1182(f) of the Immigration and Nationality Act was clear in giving the President broad authority to suspend the entry of non-citizens into the country and that Trump's Presidential Proclamation 9645 did not exceed any textual limit on the President's authority.  Under 8 U. S. C. §1182(f), a President may limit alien entry when he finds that such entry "would be detrimental to the interests of the United States." Trump determined that alien entries from some countries would be detrimental because those countries do not share adequate information with the U.S. for an informed decision on entry, and that entries from other countries are detrimental because their citizens create national security risks. Trump showed that the limits he put in place were tailored to protect American interests. The only prerequisite set forth in §1182(f) is that the President "find" that the entry of the covered aliens would be detrimental to the interests of the U.S. The Supreme Court rule: "The President has undoubtedly fulfilled that requirement here." According to Roberts, Trump acted within his powers.

Roberts pointed out that even though five of the seven nations have a Muslim majority, that fact alone "does not support an inference of religious hostility, given that the policy covers just 8% of the world's Muslim population and is limited to countries that were previously designated by Congress or prior administrations as posing national security risks." Additionally, three Muslim-majority countries have since been dropped from the original Travel Ban upon Trump's inauguration. Similarly, there are waiver exemptions such as medical that people from banned nations are eligible for. In conclusion, Roberts says the White House had shown a "sufficient national security justification". The plaintiffs had standing because they had been separated from their families.

The main issue was whether the travel ban violated the Establishment Clause to the US Constitution which prohibits the government from making any law "respecting an establishment of religion, or prohibiting the free exercise thereof." Plaintiffs argued that it did due to the President's statements regarding Islam, which may have cast doubt as to the federal objective being free from specifically targeting religion, and if religion is targeted intentionally, then strict scrutiny review applies which requires the government to show that the act was necessary to meet a compelling governmental interest. The court held that the President's travel ban did not violate the Free Exercise Clause where the statements he makes are reasonably understood to result from justification independent of unconstitutional grounds. That independent justification here was national security.  Thus, the court applied rational basis review and upheld the travel ban.

Korematsu
Part of the majority's decision referenced Korematsu v. United States, which upheld the constitutionality of President Franklin D. Roosevelt's Executive Order, which forced Japanese-American citizens into concentration camps during World War II. The dissenting opinions in Trump had raised the case among their arguments, leading Roberts to write for the majority that "[t]he dissent's reference to Korematsu, however, affords this Court the opportunity to make express what is already obvious: Korematsu was gravely wrong the day it was decided, has been overruled in the court of history, and – to be clear – 'has no place in law under the Constitution (citing Justice Robert H. Jackson's dissent from Korematsu). Scholars disagree on whether this statement "constitutes an actual overturning of Korematsu or merely disapproving dictum" of the decision.

Concurring opinions
Justice Anthony Kennedy and Justice Clarence Thomas filed concurring opinions. Kennedy concurred with the majority in finding that the President does have the authority to issue the ban, but emphasized the need for the lower courts to review the ban to make sure it itself is constitutional. In addition, Justice Kennedy went on to discuss the need for United States officials to keep the Constitution in mind when speaking, even if their statements are not able to be adjudicated using judicial review. Justice Thomas's concurrence questioned the need and immediacy of a nationwide injunction against the EO, and the ability of a District Court to issue such an injunction, supporting the decision to reverse the District Court's order.

Dissenting opinions
Justice Stephen Breyer wrote one dissenting opinion, joined by Justice Elena Kagan, where he agreed with the majority that the case should be remanded to the lower court for further review, but believed the injunction on the ban should remain. He took issue with the standards of how waivers and exemptions to the EO were being made, noting that previous Executive Orders on immigration have used consistent standards for waivers, such as Executive Order 12172 under President Jimmy Carter banning immigrants from Iran. If the current EO ban was following its waiver system, that would strengthen the government's position that the ban was religiously neutral. However, he documented several cases where the waiver process under the EO had seemingly been inconsistent, weakening the government's position. Justice Breyer concluded that Declarations, anecdotal evidence, facts, and numbers taken from amicus briefs are not judicial fact findings. The Government has not had an opportunity to respond, and a court has not had an opportunity to decide. But, given the importance of the decision in this case, the need for assurance that the Proclamation does not rest upon a 'Muslim ban', and the assistance in deciding the issue that answers to the 'exemption and waiver' questions may provide, I would send this case back to the District Court for further proceedings. And, I would leave the injunction in effect while the matter is litigated.
If this Court must decide the question without this further litigation, I would, on balance, find the evidence of antireligious bias...a sufficient reason to set the Proclamation aside.

Justice Sonia Sotomayor, joined by Justice Ruth Bader Ginsburg wrote a more scathing dissent, fully critical of the majority's opinion: The United States of America is a Nation built upon the promise of religious liberty. Our Founders honored that core promise by embedding the principle of religious neutrality in the First Amendment. The Court's decision today fails to safeguard that fundamental principle. It leaves undisturbed a policy first advertised openly and unequivocally as a "total and complete shutdown of Muslims entering the United States" because the policy now masquerades behind a façade of national-security concerns.

Justice Sotomayor took issue with a perceived double standard that the Court held with the decision in Masterpiece Cakeshop v. Colorado Civil Rights Commission, which found that government officials had treated a defendant's freedom of religious exercise with hostility, demanding the case be reheard on a more neutral basis. She wrote that "Unlike in Masterpiece, where the majority considered the state commissioners' statements about religion to be persuasive evidence of unconstitutional government action, the majority here completely sets aside the President's charged statements about Muslims as irrelevant".

Sotomayor further noted the parallels between this case and Korematsu, acknowledging the legacy of that decision and the cautions that the dissenting judges there had made towards the threat to the Constitution as a result. Although she welcomed that the majority opinion had effectively jettisoned Korematsu, she feared the decision of Trump "redeploys the same dangerous logic underlying Korematsu and merely replaces one 'gravely wrong' decision with another."

Reactions
After the Supreme Court decision, various protests were held around the United States, including one in front of the Supreme Court building in Washington, D.C. Additional protests were held in New York City, Seattle, Portland, and Atlanta.

References

External links
 
 Trump v. Hawaii at SCOTUSblog

2018 in United States case law
Donald Trump litigation
United States Supreme Court cases
United States Supreme Court cases of the Roberts Court